Amazon: Guardians of Eden is a point-and-click adventure game for MS-DOS published by Access Software in 1992. It is one of the first games with Super VGA graphics, digitized voice-overs, and an online (in game) hint system. The game was re-released on GOG.com in 26 July 2021.

Plot
Amazon is a movie adventure game about a 1957 expedition into the heart of the Amazon basin: "a desperate, crazed message sends [the player] on a perilous search through a land where legends come to life, danger hides behind every corner, and incredible treasures wait to be discovered."

Reception
Computer Gaming World wrote that beyond "masterful" graphics and sound, "Access has clearly carried their excellent story far beyond anything produced by Hollywood in its naive years". It approved of Amazon: Guardians of Eden "avoid[ing] the insulting, often embarrassingly sophomoric fashion in which women are reduced to objects of bestial lust, as is commonly the case in this genre ... parents who are only concerned with a game's sexual content need have no concerns over Amazon". The magazine concluded that the game was an "outstanding piece of work". The game was reviewed in 1993 in Dragon #193 by Hartley, Patricia, and Kirk Lesser in "The Role of Computers" column. The reviewers gave the game 5 out of 5 stars.

References

External links 

Walkthrough at GameFAQs

1992 video games
DOS games
DOS-only games
Point-and-click adventure games
ScummVM-supported games
Video games developed in the United States
Video games set in Brazil
Video games with digitized sprites
Video games set in the 1950s
Lost world video games